The 2012 Cape Verdean Football Championship season was the 33rd of the competition of the first-tier football in Cape Verde.  Its started on 5 May and finished on 7 July, slightly earlier than last year.  The tournament was organized by the Cape Verdean Football Federation.  Sporting Praia won the ninth title (eleventh overall), it would be the club's most recent title win.  This time, Sporting Praia did not participate in the 2013 CAF Champions League.  No club also participated in the 2013 CAF Confederation Cup.  In 2012, Sporting Praia won the first super cup title and would become the first club to win both the championship and the super cup title in the same season.

Overview
CS Mindelense was the defending team of the title.  A total of 12 clubs participated in the competition, one from each island league and one who won the last season's title.  It would be the first time that more than three clubs shared the same club name starting with Académica numbering five out of twelve.  Half of Group B clubs would bear the first club name but only half would bear the name in the knockout stage.  In the top semifinal bracket, those same clubs again appeared and would be the first time.  Both clubs from Santo Antão, Paulense and Académica Porto Novo would later appear in the national cup competitions.  It also marked the last appearance of Juventude from the island of Sal.

The biggest win was Sporting Praia who won 6-0 over Juventude from Sal.  SC Atlético became the second club to win all five matches in any of the six club group stage.

The finals were interrupted due to the local elections that took place on July 1.

Participating clubs

 CS Mindelense, winner of the 2011 Cape Verdean Football Championships
 Académica Operária, winner of the Boa Vista Island League
 Académica da Brava, winner of the Brava Island League
 Académica do Fogo, winner of the Fogo Premier Division
 Académico 83, winner of the Maio Island League
 Juventude, winner of the Sal Island League
 Estrela dos Amadores, winner of the Santiago Island League (North)
 Sporting Clube da Praia, winner of the Santiago South Premier Division
 Paulense Desportivo Clube, winner of the Santo Antão Island League (North)
 Académica do Porto Novo, winner of the Santo Antão Island League (South)
 SC Atlético, winner of the São Nicolau Island League
 Batuque FC, winner of the São Vicente Island League

Information about the clubs

League standings
Group A

Group B

Results

Final Stages

Semi-finals

Finals

Statistics
Top scorer: Gerson: 13 goals (of SC Atlético)
Least beaten goalkeeper: Magueti: 4 goals (of Sporting Praia)
Greatest player: Gerson (SC Atlético)
Greatest coach: Janito Carvalho (Sporting Praia)
Greatest head: Ru Évora (Sporting Praia)
Highest scoring match: Sporting Clube da Praia 6-1 Juventude do Sal (5 May)
Largest goal difference : 5 (three matches)
 CS Mindelense 5-0 Académica Operaria (12 May)
 Sporting Clube da Praia 5-0 Académica da Brava (13 May)
 Estrela dos Amadores 5-0 Académica da Brava (27 May)

See also
2011–12 in Cape Verdean football
2012 Cape Verdean Cup

References

External links

Cape Verdean Football Championship seasons
2011–12 in Cape Verdean football
Cape